New Forest East is a constituency represented in the House of Commons of the UK Parliament since 1997 by Julian Lewis, a member of  the Conservative Party.

Constituency profile
The industrial element and mid-density housing of the Southampton Water strip results in some or all Labour and Liberal Democrat councillors in this area at the local district elections from creation to date, and contributes strongly towards the latter party's peak performance leaving the winner a 9% majority in 2001. This contrasts with the Conservative winner's greatest majority to date in 2017 of 42.8% of the votes over his nearest rival which ranks Lewis among the top 10% of his party's MPs by majority.  The history of district itself is typical of inherent suburban and retiree districts as it was largely created for the preservation of the National Park and to provide contrast in planning and ethos to the City of Southampton and the Bournemouth conurbation.

The constituency covers the eastern half of the New Forest National Park in Hampshire and land to the east adjoining Southampton Water – almost the whole of its population live in the waterside settlements Totton, Marchwood, Hythe and Fawley or the major forest villages of Lyndhurst, Brockenhurst and Beaulieu.

For all areas the relevant local authority has a higher than average proportion of retired people, and a lower than national average extent of social housing and rented housing.  Housing types include far above average detached and semi-detached properties.

Boundaries

1997–2010: The District of New Forest wards of Blackfield and Langley, Boldre, Brockenhurst, Colbury, Copythorne South, Dibden and Hythe North, Dibden Purlieu, Fawley Holbury, Forest North, Forest South, Hythe South, Lyndhurst, Marchwood, Netley Marsh, Totton Central, Totton North, and Totton South.

2010–present: The District of New Forest wards of Ashurst, Copythorne South and Netley Marsh, Boldre and Sway, Bramshaw, Copythorne North and Minstead, Brockenhurst and Forest South East, Butts Ash and Dibden Purlieu, Dibden and Hythe East, Fawley, Blackfield and Langley, Furzedown and Hardley, Holbury and North Blackfield, Hythe West and Langdown, Lyndhurst, Marchwood, Totton Central, Totton East, Totton North, Totton South, and Totton West.

History
This constituency was created when the old New Forest constituency was divided for the 1997 general election. All election results but one since its creation suggest that it is a Conservative safe seat. The 2001 election produced a marginal victory when the Liberal Democrats came within 4,000 votes of winning, closer than any challengers since.

Members of Parliament

Elections

2010s

2000s

1990s

See also
List of parliamentary constituencies in Hampshire

Notes

References

Sources
Election result, 2005 (BBC)
Election results, 1997 - 2001 (BBC)
Election results, 1997–2001 (Election Demon)
Election results, 1997 - 2005 (Guardian)

Parliamentary constituencies in Hampshire
Constituencies of the Parliament of the United Kingdom established in 1997
New Forest District